Na Yoon-sun (born August 28, 1969), also known as Youn Sun Nah, is a South Korean jazz musician.

Life and career 
Na Yoon-sun was born on August 28, 1969, in Seoul. Her parents are musical: her father, Na Young-soo (나영수), is a conductor in Korea and her mother, Kim Mi-jung (김미정), is a musical actress. She studied French literature at Konkuk University in Korea. While she was working for a fashion company, she was scouted by Kim Min-gi (김민기), who was the president of the Hakchon Theater Company (극단 학전). There, she made her acting debut in a musical called Subway Line 1 (지하철 1호선).

Having been exposed to many kinds of music by her parents, Na decided to study and sing jazz after her performance in Subway Line 1. In 1995, she went to Paris to study jazz and chanson. There, she studied jazz at the CIM Jazz School, the National Music Institute of Beauvais, Nadia and the Lili Boulanger Conservatory. After graduating, she taught students at the CIM Jazz School from 2000 to 2001. She formed her own quintet, YSN 5tet, and performed at various jazz clubs, theaters, festivals, and bars in France. Also in 2001 she released her debut album, Reflet. Her mostly self-composed 2002 album, Light for the people, was her first album to receive a wide distribution. She recorded the follow-up, Down by love, with guitarist Olivier Ode. With her 2004 release So I am she became more known in Europe.

In 2007, she made a pop record, Memory Lane. In 2008, she signed a contract with German label ACT, and in 2009 was acknowledged for her musical contributions in France by receiving Chevaliers of the Ordre des Arts et des Lettres. She released Same Girl in 2010. In 2011, she gave about 180 performances in more than 13 countries. In 2011, this rose to about 200 performances in more than twenty-five countries in 2012. In 2013 she released Lento.

Vocal style 
She was not influenced by any historical jazz musicians, because she did not have any knowledge of jazz music until her late start as a singer. Even though she began studying jazz history in Paris, it was after she had already created her own vocal style. Rather, she sang various genres of music from classical music to rock music by herself before she studied jazz in Paris.

Discography

Studio albums

Singles
"My Favorite Things" (August 10, 2010)

Other contributions
Buddha Bar Volume 5 features a song named "Road" created by Refractory (a French music group) and sung by Na Yoon-sun, under the name "Youn Sun Nah".

She appears on multiple songs of the 2011 release "Songs of Freedom" by French guitarist Nguyên Lê.

Awards 

 Chanson competition (French Cultural Center, South Korea), Winner (1989)
 Festival de Jazz de Montmartre (France), Second prize (1998)
 France St-Maur Jazz (France), Winner (1998)
 Concours national de jazz de la Défense (France), Special Jury Prize (1999)
 This year's jazz singer award (South Korea), Winner (2000)
 The 1st Korea Pop Music Awards for Best Crossover (2004)
 Antibes ‘Jazz a Juan’, Winner (2005)
 Today's popular music Awards Young Artist Award, Winner (2005)
 The 5th Korea Pop Music Awards for Best Jass&Crossover
 6th Korea Best Pop Music Jazz Album Award (2009)
 Chevaliers of the Ordre des Arts et des Lettres (2009)
 BMW Welt Jazz Award, Second prize (2010)
 The 8th Korea Best Pop Music Jazz Crossover Jazz Album, Winner (2011)
 Eco-Jazz foreign female artists of the year, Winner (2011)
 The 3rd Pop Culture Awards Prime Minister's commendation (2012)

References

External links 
 

1969 births
Living people
South Korean jazz singers
South Korean musical theatre actresses
Chevaliers of the Ordre des Arts et des Lettres
Konkuk University alumni
Artists from Seoul
ACT Music artists
Korean Music Award winners
20th-century South Korean women singers
21st-century South Korean women singers
South Korean women singer-songwriters